As of April 2017, Air France Hop - formerly named HOP! - serves the following destinations:

Destinations

 Prague - Václav Havel Airport Prague

 Agen - Agen La Garenne Airport Terminated
 Ajaccio - Ajaccio Napoleon Bonaparte Airport
 Aurillac - Aurillac – Tronquières Airport
 Biarritz - Biarritz Pays Basque Airport Seasonal 
 Brive-la-Gaillarde - Brive – Souillac Airport
 Caen - Caen – Carpiquet Airport (operated by Chalair)
 Castres - Castres–Mazamet Airport
 Clermont-Ferrand - Clermont-Ferrand Auvergne Airport
 La Rochelle - La Rochelle – Île de Ré Airport
 Lille - Lille Airport
 Limoges - Limoges – Bellegarde Airport
 Lyon - Lyon–Saint-Exupéry Airport base
 Marseille - Marseille Provence Airport
 Montpellier - Montpellier–Méditerranée Airport
 Nice - Nice Côte d'Azur Airport
 Paris
 Charles de Gaulle Airport base
 Orly Airport base
 Pau - Pau Pyrénées Airport
 Perpignan - Perpignan–Rivesaltes Airport Seasonal 
 Poitiers - Poitiers–Biard Airport
 Quimper - Quimper–Cornouaille Airport
 Rennes - Rennes–Saint-Jacques Airport
 Rouen - Rouen Airport
 Strasbourg - Strasbourg Airport
 Toulouse - Toulouse–Blagnac Airport

 Düsseldorf - Düsseldorf Airport
 Hamburg - Hamburg Airport
 Nurenberg - Nuremberg Airport
 Stuttgart - Stuttgart Airport
 Frankfurt - Frankfurt Airport
 Munich - Munich Airport
 Berlin - Berlin Brandenburg Airport

 Bologna - Bologna Guglielmo Marconi Airport
 Milan - Milan Malpensa Airport
 Rome - Leonardo da Vinci–Fiumicino Airport
 Venice - Venice Marco Polo Airport

 Edinburgh - Edinburgh Airport
 London - Heathrow Airport
 Manchester - Manchester Airport
 Birmingham - Birmingham Airport
 Newcastle - Newcastle International Airport

 Amsterdam - Amsterdam Airport Schiphol

 Madrid - Adolfo Suárez Madrid–Barajas Airport
 Seville - Seville Airport
 Málaga - Málaga Airport
 Valencia - Valencia Airport

 Lisbon - Lisbon Airport
 Porto - Porto Airport

 Salzburg - Salzburg Airport
 Innsbruck - Innsbruck Airport

 Dublin - Dublin Airport
 Cork - Cork Airport

 Copenhagen - Copenhagen Airport
 Billund - Billund Airport

 Algiers - Houari Boumediene Airport

References

Lists of airline destinations
Air France–KLM